Bryce Peila (born May 8, 1990) is a professional American football linebacker who is currently a free agent. After graduating in 2008 from Crater High School in Central Point, Oregon he attended Western Oregon University and played for the school's football team for four years (2009–12). Peila is second all-time in the Great Northwest Athletic Conference in career interceptions with 20. He also holds the record for return yards with 437 . After his college career was over, Peila kept in football condition while working outside the sport. In 2014, he worked out for Portland Thunder head coach Matthew Sauk and was subsequently signed to one-year contract to play for the team during their inaugural season. On March 10, 2017, Peila was assigned to the Washington Valor. On April 5, 2017, Peila was placed on recallable reassignment. On May 2, 2017, Peila was assigned to the Philadelphia Soul. On August 26, 2017, the Soul beat the Tampa Bay Storm in ArenaBowl XXX by a score of 44–40.

References

1990 births
Sportspeople from Medford, Oregon
Players of American football from Oregon
American football linebackers
Western Oregon Wolves football players
Portland Thunder players
Portland Steel players
Washington Valor players
Philadelphia Soul players
Living people